McNab, MacNab, Macnab, MacNabb or Mac-Nab is a surname. Notable people with the surname include:

 Alex McNab, Scottish-US soccer player and coach
 Sir Allan MacNab, 1st Bt (1798–1862), Canadian military and political leader
 Andrew McNab (born 1984), Canadian ski mountaineer
 Andy McNab (born 1959), British novelist
 Archibald McNab (1826–1924), Canadian politician
 Archibald Peter McNab (1864–1945), Canadian politician
 Bob McNab (born 1943), English football player
 Buzz McNab, fictional character 
 Chica Macnab (1889-1980), Scottish artist
 Claire McNab (born 1940), Australian writer
 Colin McNab (born 1961), British chess Grandmaster
 Colin McNab (footballer) (1902–1970), Scottish footballer
 David McNab (disambiguation)
 Donovan McNabb (born 1976), NFL quarterback
 Duncan McNab (1820–1896), missionary
 Frank McNab (died 1878), member of the Lincoln County Regulators
 James McNab, first settler in Norval, Ontario
 James Charles Macnab of Macnab (1926–2013), 23rd chief of Clan Macnab
 Jim McNab (1940–2006), footballer
 Jock McNab (born 1894), footballer
 Malcolm McNab, session musician
 Max McNab (1924–2007), Canadian ice hockey player, coach, and NHL General Manager
 Mercedes McNab (born 1980), Canadian actress
 Judge Michael A. McNab (born 1975), St. Bernard Parish Justice of The Peace for Ward F in Louisiana
 Neil McNab (born 1947), Scottish footballer
 Peter McNab (1952-2022), Canadian ice hockey player
 Robert McNab (1864–1917), New Zealand politician
 Sam McNab (1926–1995), Scottish professional footballer
 Sandy McNab (1911–1962), Scottish footballer
 Thomas McNab (1849–1929), Canadian alderman
 Tom McNab (born 1933), New Zealand footballer
 William McNab (engineer) (1855–1923) Canadian engineer
 William Ramsay McNab (1844–1929) Scottish botanist

See also
 McNab/Braeside, Ontario, township in Canada
 McNab, Arkansas, town in Hempstead County, United States
 McNabs Island, island in Halifax Harbour, Canada
 Clan MacNab, Scottish clan
 McNab (dog), dog breed
 John Macnab, novel by John Buchan
 McNabb, surname